A vote is a formal method of choosing in an election.

Vote(s) or The Vote may also refer to:

Music
V.O.T.E., an album by Chris Stamey and Yo La Tengo, 2004
"Vote", a song by the Submarines from Declare a New State!, 2006

Television
"The Vote" (Dynasty 1983), an episode
"The Vote" (Dynasty 1986), an episode
"The Vote" (The Guardian), an episode

Other uses
Vote, Virginia, an unincorporated community in the United States
The Vote, a 2015 play by James Graham
The Vote, a 1909-1933 newspaper of the Women's Freedom League
Vote.org, an American left-wing nonprofit organization
Votians, a Finno-Ugric people

See also 

Voter (disambiguation)
Voting logic